Medvedka is an urban locality (an urban-type settlement) in Gornozavodsky District of Perm Krai, Russia. Population:

History 
The settlement originated at the site of diamond mining, which began here in 1946. It is mentioned in written sources since 1950.

The status of township - since 1952.

References

Urban-type settlements in Perm Krai
Populated places in Gornozavodsky District